Gwendolyn Faith Hunter is an American author and blogger, writing in the fantasy  and thriller genres. She writes as Faith Hunter in the fantasy genre, and as Gwen Hunter in the thriller genre. She also has collaborated on thrillers with Gary Leveille, jointly using the name Gary Hunter. Hunter is one of the founding members of the blog, MagicalWords.net, a writer assistance blog, and has developed a role-playing game based on her Rogue Mage series.

Biography
Hunter grew up in the Louisiana bayou country and began writing during high school. She graduated from college with a degree in Allied Health Technology and used to work full-time in a rural hospital. She resides in South Carolina with her husband, Rod Hunter.

Reception
Critical reception for Hunter's work has been positive, with Monsters and Critics praising Bloodring as "an entertaining, if a bit rough first volume in a promising new series". Publishers Weekly and Kirkus Reviews also reviewed Bloodring, with Publishers Weekly praising the "strong, cliffhanger ending".

Bibliography

as Gary Hunter

Garrick Travis series
Death Warrant, October 1990, Warner Books, 
Death Sentence, July 1992, Warner Books,

as Gwen Hunter

Rhea Lynch, M.D. series

DeLande Saga series

reissue: 

reissue: 

reissue:

Stand-alone books

Nonfiction
"Whitewater Evolution: A Novelist's Route from Phobia to Obsession", American Whitewater, March/April 2009, page 60-61

as Faith Hunter

Rogue Mage series

Jane Yellowrock series

These are in chronological order to match the timeline of the books.

Soulwood series

Unrelated
Magic School for Geezers, June 7, 2022, Dirty Deeds 2,

Nonfiction
"Common Misconceptions About Writers", Crossed Genres, Issue 1.

See also

Urban Fantasy
List of fantasy authors
List of fantasy novels
List of thriller writers

References

External links
 
 Gwen Hunter's homepage
 Yellowrock Securities - website for fictional character Jane Yellowrock
 Magical Words — Writing blog of Faith Hunter, David B. Coe, Misty Massey, A.J. Hartley, Stuart Jaffe, and Edmund R. Schubert
 

20th-century American novelists
21st-century American novelists
American fantasy writers
American women short story writers
Hunter, Gwen
American women novelists
Living people
Novelists from Louisiana
Role-playing game writers
Year of birth missing (living people)
Novelists from South Carolina
Urban fantasy writers
Women science fiction and fantasy writers
20th-century American women writers
21st-century American women writers
Women thriller writers
20th-century American short story writers
21st-century American short story writers